Levan Koguashvili (March 18, 1973) is a Georgian film director and screenwriter. He studied in Gerasimov Institute of Cinematography after graduating school.

Biography
Levan Koguashvili was born in 1973 in Tbilisi, Georgia. He began his studies at the State Institute of Film and Theatre in Tbilisi, and then worked as a journalist for independent television after civil war broke out in Georgia. He studied Film Directing at the Russian State University of Cinematography (VGIK) in Moscow between 1994 and 1999.

He Graduated from the Tisch School of Art's Graduate Film Program in New York City in 2006 and he made several short films and documentaries. His 2006 short film, The Debt, was an Official Selection of the 2006 Sundance Film Festival, and his documentary, Women from Georgia, was selected for the Panorama section of the 2009 Sarajevo Film Festival.

Levan lived in New York City where he made several short films and documentaries. His first feature film, Street Days, which was made in 2010, won several international prizes including Tiger Award at Rotterdam International Film Festival. The Hollywood Reporter observed that "Absurdity and despair, in equal measure, infuse the decaying urban landscape of the Tbilisi-set Street Days."

His second feature Blind Dates, made in 2013, won the Special Jury Award at the Abu Dhabi Film Festival 2013 in "section New Horizons". 

His third feature, Brighton 4th, in 2021, won the best picture award at the Asian World Film Festival in Los Angeles, and three awards each at the  Tribeca Film Festival and FilmFestival Cottbus.

Filmography

Feature
 The Debt  (2006), (short)
 Street Days (2010)
 Blind Dates (2013)
 Brighton 4th (2021)

Documentary
 Women from Georgia (2009)
 Gogita's New Life (2016)

References

External links

 International Documentary Film Festival Amsterdam

1973 births
Living people
Film directors from Georgia (country)
Screenwriters from Georgia (country)
Film people from Tbilisi
Gerasimov Institute of Cinematography alumni